Argyrocosma is a genus of moths in the family Geometridae.

Species
 Argyrocosma argosticta (Turner, 1904)
 Argyrocosma consobrina (Warren, 1897)
 Argyrocosma inductaria (Guenée, 1857)
 Argyrocosma phrixopa Meyrick
 Argyrocosma strepens Prout, 1932

References
 Argyrocosma at Markku Savela's Lepidoptera and Some Other Life Forms

Geometrinae
Geometridae genera